Brain waves are rhythmic or repetitive neural activity in the central nervous system.

Brain wave or brainwave may also refer to:

Arts
Brain Wave, a science fiction novel by Poul Anderson
Brainwave (comics), two characters in the DC Comics Universe
Brainwaves (comic strip), cartoon series by Betsy Streeter

Film
BrainWaves, a 1982 film directed by Ulli Lommel

Organizations
Epilepsy Ireland, an organisation formerly known as "Brainwave – The Irish Epilepsy Association"